Axe Lake Swamp State Nature Preserve is a  nature reserve located near Barlow, Kentucky in Ballard County in an area known locally as "the Barlow bottoms", a wetland created by periodic flooding along the mouth of the Ohio River. These lots, the gate and an access road were maintained by a member/share-holder organization which agreed to the lake's dedication as a nature reserve on February 20, 1991. An additional  was dedicated on December 11, 2001.

The Office of Kentucky Nature Preserves has identified Axe Lake as the centerpiece of an expanded long-term project to protect 3,000 acres (12 km²) of bald cypress-tupelo swamp lands which is to be called the Axe Lake Swamp wetlands complex. This cypress-tupelo swamp is the best example of a large intact cypress-tupelo swamp in Kentucky. This protected area is known to support at least eight rare plant and animal species. The site has been recognized as a priority wetland in the North American Waterfowl Management Plan. Written permission is required for access to the preserve.

Wildlife
Wetlands species of interest:
Bald Cypress (Taxodium distichum)
Great blue heron (Ardea herodias)
Great egret (Casmerodius albus)
Wood duck (Aix sponsa)

References

Protected areas of Ballard County, Kentucky
Biodiversity
Nature reserves in Kentucky
Swamps of Kentucky
Wetlands of Kentucky
Protected areas established in 1991
Landforms of Ballard County, Kentucky
1991 establishments in Kentucky